IBM's History Flow tool is a visualization tool for a time-sequence of snapshots of a document in various stages of its creation. The tool supports tracking contributions to the article by different users, and can identify which parts of a document have remained unchanged over the course of many full-document revisions. The tool was developed by Fernanda Viégas, Martin Wattenberg, Jonathan Feinberg, and Kushal Dave of IBM's Collaborative User Experience research group.

IBM Research has done an analysis of Wikipedia usage and edits using a history flow tool. The tool is no longer available for download from the IBM Research website. However, a similar tool referencing it is available on GitHub. A similar application have been released.

References

External links
 History flow paper (pdf), 2004 - presented at CHI 2004, in Vienna on 24 April-29 April.  A demonstration of History Flow using the histories of various Wikipedia articles, using a database snapshot from May 2003.
 ReplayEdits
 Many tools at Wikipedia History contest
 Mixing Oil and Water: Authorship in a Wiki World

History Flow tool
Wikis